Virginia's 13th congressional district is an obsolete U.S. congressional district. Its last Member of Congress was Elbert S. Martin.

List of members representing the district

References 

 Congressional Biographical Directory of the United States 1774–present

13
Former congressional districts of the United States
1793 establishments in Virginia
Constituencies established in 1793
1863 disestablishments in Virginia
Constituencies disestablished in 1863